The 1970 Taça de Portugal Final was the final match of the 1969–70 Taça de Portugal, the 30th season of the Taça de Portugal, the premier Portuguese football cup competition organized by the Portuguese Football Federation (FPF). The match was played on 14 June 1970 at the Estádio Nacional in Oeiras, and opposed two Primeira Liga sides: Benfica and Sporting CP. Benfica defeated Sporting CP 3–1 to claim a fourteenth Taça de Portugal.

Match

Details

References

1970
Taca
S.L. Benfica matches
Sporting CP matches